Per Anders Rudling (born 11 April 1974 in Karlstad) is a Swedish-American historian, an associate professor of the Department of History at Lund University (Sweden), specializing in the areas of nationalism.

Education 
Rudling has a Master of Arts degree in Russian from Uppsala University (1998), an Master of Arts degree in history from San Diego State University (2003), Ph.D. in history from the University of Alberta (Edmonton, Canada) (2009), and post-doc at University of Greifswald, Germany.

Career 
He is the author of The Rise and Fall of Belarusian Nationalism, 1906-1931, published by University of Pittsburgh Press, devoted to the subject of present-day Belarusian nationalism from its origins until the 1930s. The book won the Kulczycki Book Prize in Polish Studies in 2015.

Rudling became the subject of international attention in October 2012 when a group of Ukrainian organizations in Canada delivered a signed protest to his employer, accusing him of betraying his own university's principles. The letter came as a response to Rudling's own public criticism of what he called a glorification of OUN-B, and the UPA, as well as Stepan Bandera, and Roman Shukhevych by fellow historian Ruslan Zabily from Ukraine in his Canadian and American lecture tour. Rudling delivered a communiqué from Lund to concerned universities pointing out to the role of OUN-B in the Holocaust in Ukraine and the UPA involvement in the massacres of Poles in Volhynia and Eastern Galicia. He also wrote about Bandera's antisemitism and political violence during World War II leading to ethnic cleansing of not only Poles and Jews but also Ukrainians themselves. In response to the Canadian-Ukrainian complaint about Rudling, an open letter was published in his support by a large group of academic researchers.

Selected academic publications 

 Long-Distance Nationalism: Ukrainian Monuments and Historical Memory in Multicultural Canada 32 page book chapter in Public Memory in the Context of Transnational Migration and Displacement, Palgrave Macmillan, 2020
 Eugenics and Racial Anthropology in the Ukrainian Radical Nationalist Tradition, Cambridge University Press, 201
 The Khatyn Massacre in Belorussia: A Historical Controversy Revisited Holocaust and Genocide Studies, Volume 26, Issue 1, Spring 2012, Pages 29–58, https://doi.org/10.1093/hgs/dcs011
 ‘They Defended Ukraine’: The 14. Waffen-Grenadier-Division der SS (Galizische Nr. 1) Revisited The Journal of Slavic Military Studies, Volume 25, 2012 - Issue 3

References

Living people
21st-century Swedish historians
Swedish male writers
1974 births
Historians of World War II
Uppsala University alumni
San Diego State University alumni
University of Alberta alumni
Scholars of nationalism
Historians of Belarus